Axel Hampus Dalström (22 March 1829 – 19 March 1882), was a Finnish architect. He was the director of the National Board of Public Building from 1869 to 1882. Dalström is best known for the Old Student House in Helsinki as well as for seven Lighthouses he designed in the 1870s.

Works 
 Sälskär Lighthouse, Hammarland (1868)
 Old Student House, Helsinki (1870)
 Marjaniemi Lighthouse, Hailuoto (1871)
 Ulkokalla Lighthouse, Kalajoki (1871)
 Säppi Lighthouse, Luvia (1873)
 Oulun Lyseon Lukio, Oulu (expansion 1875, with Florentin Granholm)
 Sälgrund Lighthouse, Kaskinen (1875)
 The Guards Manege, Helsinki (1877)
 Heinäluoto Lighthouse, Salmi (1877)
 Savonlinna Cathedral, Savonlinna (1879)
 Hanhipaasi Lighthouse, Sortavala (1879)
 Svenska normallyceum, Helsinki (1880)

References 

1829 births
1882 deaths
Architects from Helsinki
People from the Grand Duchy of Finland
19th-century Finnish architects